Valvarrone is a comune (municipality) in the Province of Lecco in the Italian region Lombardy.

It was established on 1 January 2018 by the merger of the municipalities of Introzzo, Tremenico and Vestreno.

References

Cities and towns in Lombardy
Valsassina